Notocypraea piperita, common name peppered cowrie, is a species of sea snail, a cowry, a marine gastropod mollusk in the family Cypraeidae, the cowries.

Description
Notocypraea piperita has a shell reaching a size of 16–30 mm. The dorsum surface usually shows pale brown or peach-coloured transversal bands on a paler background, while the base is whitish or yellowish, with small dark spots on the ventral margin.

Habitat
This cowry lives subtidally on rocks.

Distribution
This species and its subspecies occur in the seas along southern Australia and northern Tasmania.

Subspecies
Notocypraea piperita bicolor Gaskoin, 1849
Notocypraea piperita piperita Gray, 1825

References
 Lorenz F. & Hubert A. (2000) A guide to worldwide cowries. Edition 2. Hackenheim: Conchbooks. 584 pp
 Lorenz F. (2005) Taxonomic notes on two poorly known species of Notocypraea (Gastropoda: Cypraeidae). Visaya 1(5):16-21

External links
 Biolib
 WoRMS
 Encyclopedia of Life
 
 Molluscs of Tasmania
 Flmnh

Cypraeidae
Gastropods described in 1825
Taxa named by John Edward Gray